Chu, known in historiography as Ma Chu or Southern Chu, was a dynastic state of China that existed from 907 to 951. It is listed as one of the Ten Kingdoms during the Five Dynasties and Ten Kingdoms period of Chinese history.

Founding
Ma Yin was named regional governor by the Tang court in 896 after fighting against a rebel named Yang Xingmi. He declared himself as the Prince of Chu with the fall of the Tang Dynasty in 907. Ma's position as Prince of Chu was confirmed by the Later Tang in the north in 927 and was given the posthumous title of King Wumu of Chu.

Territories
The capital of the Chu Kingdom was Changsha (Tanzhou).  Present-day Hunan and northeastern Guangxi were under the control of the kingdom.

Economy
Chu was peaceful and prosperous under Ma Yin's rule, exporting horses, silk and tea. Silk and lead coinage were often used as currency, particularly with external communities which would not accept other coinage of the land. Taxation was low for the peasantry and merchants.

Fall of Chu
After Ma Yin died the leadership was subject to struggle and conflict which resulted in the fall of the kingdom. The Southern Tang, fresh from its conquest of the Min Kingdom, took advantage and conquered the kingdom in 951. The ruling family was removed to the Southern Tang capital of Jinling.  However, the following year, Chu generals rose against Southern Tang and expelled the Southern Tang expeditionary force, leaving the former Chu territory to be ruled by several of those generals called Wuping Jiedushi (武平军节度使) in succession until 963, when the territory was seized by Song Dynasty.  During these post-Chu years of de facto independence, the center of power was usually at Lang Prefecture (朗州, in modern Changde, Hunan).

Rulers

Ma rulers family tree

Notes

References

 
Five Dynasties and Ten Kingdoms
Dynasties in Chinese history
Former countries in Chinese history
10th-century establishments in China
907 establishments
951 disestablishments
10th-century disestablishments in China
States and territories established in the 900s
States and territories disestablished in the 950s